The Brave Little Toaster Goes to Mars is a 1998 American animated musical film. It is based on the 1988 novella of the same name by Thomas M. Disch. It is the sequel to The Brave Little Toaster to the Rescue (1997). The film was released direct-to-video on May 19, 1998, in the United States by Walt Disney Home Video.

It featured the last performances of actors DeForest Kelley, Paddi Edwards, Thurl Ravenscroft, and Carol Channing before their deaths in 1999, 2005, and 2019, respectively.

Plot
Rob and Chris have a baby boy named Robbie. At first the appliances all think that they will pay more attention to him but later get used to him ("I See a New You"). Later, the Hearing Aid, who was left in a drawer in their new house from the past owner gets out of the drawer and passes everyone who is asleep. Toaster then sees him and follows him up to the attic. Toaster gets very suspicious about him when he was talking to someone in space.

The next morning, Toaster tells what happened last night then they all agree to stay on watch of the drawer till he comes out. Later when it is midnight everyone falls asleep just when Hearing Aid escapes from the drawer. The "little master", as they call Robbie, awakes to the sound and gets out of his crib and follows Hearing Aid. The appliances awake and find Robbie going up the stairs. Lampy tries to get him down, but he is dragged up the stairs and his plug slips out and falls down the stairs. The appliances appear in the room when a big beam of light appears. The appliances chase after Hearing Aid but then Robbie disappears in a bubble through space. After that they all find out that he was sent to Mars.

They get Wittgenstein the old supercomputer to help them and gives them advice. They get the microwave and cheddar cheese popcorn to help them fly, as it is organic, a laundry basket, and the ceiling fan. They set off in space to go to Mars and find Robbie. During their flight a pack of balloons appear who fly endlessly in space from hands who let them go ("Floating"). The appliances crash on Mars and find Robbie. They meet a Christmas angel named Tinselina who was sent to Mars with Viking 1. The appliances follow a group of military toasters who had just arrived to their leader Supreme Commander who is a huge refrigerator. They then learn that they are going to blow the Earth up because their old owners threw them out, and Toaster tries to talk them out of it. In between the fight, Robbie is able to push a hand out of his bubble. His hand touches Supreme Commander, and the refrigerator suddenly begins to turn pink. He smiles at the child, before returning his original color.

Toaster ends up between an election with Supreme Commander ("Humans"). After a while we learn that Toaster wins the election and is the new Supreme Commander. The appliances go into the freezer of Supreme Commander and find another Hearing Aid that is the brother of Hearing Aid. They have not seen each other in the last sixty years. When asked by Toaster why Supreme Commander changed his mind about blowing up the Earth, he says "the touch of the small boy's hand" reminded him that not all humans are bad. They are all about to return to Earth when suddenly Hearing aid's brother forgot to deactivate the rocket. The missile counts down. Toaster jumps off with Hearing Aid's brother and destroys the rocket. Toaster is almost left on Mars, but the others come back for him. After Toaster is on board, Tinselina gives up her clothes so they can have something organic to get back to Earth.

The appliances happily ride back to Earth ("Home Again"). The appliances return to Earth just in time as the baby monitor that Ratso, their pet rat, had been restraining all night, finally wakes Rob and Chris up. One day when they are taping Robbie, Rob finds Tinselina in a trash can and fixes her up. It is a happy ending with Robbie's first word is "Toaster!" and Tinselina's first time on a Christmas tree. It is a happy ending with the appliances having a happy Christmas with the little master.

Voice cast
 Deanna Oliver as Toaster: A brave, optimistic toaster
 Thurl Ravenscroft as Kirby: A cantankerous but well-meaning vacuum cleaner.
 Roger Kabler as Radio: A wisecracking, pretentious dial A.M. radio alarm clock.
 Timothy Stack as Lampy: A neurotic, slightly irascible, yet enthusiastic gooseneck lamp.
 Eric Lloyd as Blanky: A childlike electric blanket. In the movie, he has matured slightly and forms a bond with Robbie.
 Fyvush Finkel as Hearing Aid: An elderly hearing aid who was created by his former owner Albert Einstein. He accidentally beams Robbie onto Mars, triggering the rescue mission. During the adventure, he is reunited with his brother.
 Stephen Tobolowsky as Calculator: A smart and adventurous pocket-sized calculator. He serves as the coordinator of rescue.
 Wayne Knight as Microwave: A boastful, offensive, but helpful microwave oven who powers the appliance's makeshift aircraft to rescue Robbie.
 Carol Channing as Fanny: A sardonic, grumpy but helpful overhead ceiling fan. She provides the propulsion of the appliances' makeshift aircraft, using power from Microwave microwaving the popcorn. 
 Kath Soucie as Tinselina: A beautiful Christmas angel ornament living on Mars. Kind, soft-spoken, knowledgeable and sensitive, she becomes the appliances' guide on Mars.
 Chris Young as Master Rob McGroarty: The appliances' master, husband of Chris and father of Robbie. Works as a vet in a barn right next to his house.
 Jessica Tuck as Mistress Chris McGroarty: the appliances' mistress, wife of Rob, and mother of Robbie.
 Russi Taylor as Little Master Rob "Robbie" McGroarty: Rob and Chris's baby son. He was beamed into outer space and sent to Mars. He is seemingly aware of the appliances' sentience, going so far as bringing the five main appliances in front of the Christmas tree in the film's ending. 
 Farrah Fawcett as Faucet: A motherly automatic faucet on a kitchen sink who lives in Rob and Chris's new home.
 Redmond O'Neal as Squirt: A nozzle sprayer who is Faucet's son.
 Andy Milder as Ratso: Rob and Chris's pet rat who is friends with the appliances. Sarcastic, slightly cantankerous but helpful, he stays on Earth to keep the baby monitor at bay and Rob and Chris unaware of Robbie's disappearance.
 Scott Menville as Baby Monitor: A baby monitor.
 Brian Doyle-Murray as Wittgenstein: A prototype vacuum-tube-based radio supercomputer.
 Alan King as Supreme Commander: The leader of Mars' appliances. Believing that humans are cruel and take advantage of appliances' obsolescence, the Supreme Commander plots to destroy Earth. He first appears as a giant refrigerator, but is later revealed to be Hearing Aid's long-lost twin brother.
 Jim Cummings provides the singing voice of the Supreme Commander
 DeForest Kelley as Viking 1: The Viking 1 Spacecraft who is among the first Mars denizens to greet the appliances. He serves as a fatherly figure to Tinselina, seeming sad when Tinselina decides to leave Mars to Earth with Toaster and the gang.
 Susie Stevens-Logan as Wild West Balloon
 Marc Allen Lewis as World's Fair Balloon
 Rick Logan as Woodstock Balloon
 Paddi Edwards as Satellite #1
 James Murray as Satellite #2
 Jeff Robertson as Military Toaster
 Ross Mapletoft as Mixer
 James Murray as Iron
 Marc Allen Lewis as Freezer
 Ed Gilbert as Refrigerator

Music
In addition to four original songs, the soundtrack also includes the song "Bread and Butter" by The Newbeats, played at the film's opening. The score was composed by Alexander Janko.

Reception 
The Brave Little Toaster Goes to Mars was met with mixed to negative reviews from critics and fans of the original film, with criticism concentrated on its contrived plot and its perceived inferiority to its predecessor.

References

External links

 
 
 

1988 American novels
1998 animated films
1998 direct-to-video films
1990s American animated films
1990s fantasy adventure films
1998 science fiction films
1998 films
1990s musical films
American sequel films
American children's animated adventure films
American children's animated comic science fiction films
American children's animated science fantasy films
American children's animated musical films
American direct-to-video films
American fantasy adventure films
Children's science fiction novels
Direct-to-video animated films
Direct-to-video sequel films
Mars in film
Novels by Thomas M. Disch
Buena Vista Home Entertainment direct-to-video films
Hyperion Pictures films
Animated films about rats
Films with screenplays by Willard Carroll
1990s children's animated films
The Brave Little Toaster
Films produced by Donald Kushner
The Kushner-Locke Company films
1990s English-language films